Ballmer is a surname. Notable people with the surname include:

 Karl Ballmer (1891–1958), Swiss painter, anthroposophical philosopher, and writer
 Steve Ballmer (born 1956), American businessman who formerly served as the chief executive officer of Microsoft
 Théo Ballmer (1902–1965) Swiss graphic designer, photographer, and professor

See also
 Balmer (surname)